Shinee World The Best 2018  (promoted as "SHINee WORLD THE BEST 2018～FROM NOW ON～") was the sixth Japan concert tour by South Korean boy band Shinee. This tour was described as a culmination of Shinee's activities in Japan since debut, kicking off in Kyocera Dome Osaka on February 17, 2018, and ending in Tokyo Dome on February 27, 2018. The associated album for this tour was Shinee The Best From Now On. The concerts drew in audiences of over 180,000.

After Jonghyun's death on December 18, 2017, the remaining members entered into discussions on whether to postpone the concerts and decided to hold them as scheduled. In the concerts, Jonghyun appeared posthumously using isolated vocal tracks and clips from previous performances being played on the video screens. For the final encore, "From Now On", which was the final track he recorded with the group, the remaining members performed with an empty space and microphone stand in the middle of the four, which was illuminated while Jonghyun's vocals were played on tape.

Set list

Schedule

References

External links
SM Entertainment - Official website
Shinee - Official South Korean website
Shinee - Official Japanese website

Shinee concert tours
2018 concert tours